The National Investor Relations Institute, known as "NIRI," is a United States professional association for investor relations (IR) professionals.  Located in Alexandria, Virginia, NIRI is the professional association of corporate officers and investor relations consultants responsible for communications among corporate management, shareholders, securities analysts and other financial publics.  NIRI's more than 2,800 members represent over 1,350 publicly held companies and $7 trillion in stock market capitalization.  NIRI was founded in 1969 and has 33 chapters located throughout the United States.

Through its collaborative community, NIRI advances engagement in the capital markets and drives best practices in corporate disclosures, governance, and informed investing.  NIRI provides members with information resources, professional development and educational opportunities, and peer networking.  NIRI acts as an advocate for the IR profession as well as the IR professional.

It publishes "best practices" guidelines for public companies which encourage companies to adopt a written disclosure policy.

In 2016, NIRI introduced the first Investor Relations professional credential in the U.S., the Investor Relations Charter(sm).

References

External links
NIRI website

Non-profit organizations based in Alexandria, Virginia
Business organizations based in the United States
Investment in the United States
Professional associations based in the United States
Organizations established in 1969
1969 establishments in the United States